"The knight who could make cunts speak" (French: "Le Chevalier qui fist parler les cons") is a French fabliau. Seven versions of it remain, including one in MS Harley 2253 (a manuscript ca. 1340 which also contains the Harley Lyrics).

Summary
The main character of the story is an impoverished vassal who lacks even a coat or a hat; he has pawned all his possessions, though he still has a squire, who gets the plot going when he steals the clothes of three maidens who were bathing. When the knight restores the clothing and the maidens dress themselves, they give him three gifts. The first gives him the power to entertain anyone and get paid for it. The second gives him the power to hear vaginas speak if he addresses them. The third adds to that power: if a vagina is prevented from speaking, the anus will respond for it.

Editions 
There are seven manuscripts containing the fabliau, six French and one in Anglo-Norman (the latter in MS Harley 2253):
A. Paris, Bibliothèque nationale de France, français, 837, f. 148va-149vb
B. Bern, Burgerbibliothek, 354, f. 169ra-174rb
C. Berlin, Staatsbibliothek und Preussischer Kulturbesitz, Hamilton 257, f. 7vb-10vb 
D. Paris, Bibliothèque nationale de France, français, 19152, f. 58ra-60rc
E. Paris, Bibliothèque nationale de France, français, 1593, f. 211rb-215ra | ccviii-ccxii | 208rb-212ra
I. Paris, Bibliothèque nationale de France, français, 25545, f. 77va-82vb
M. London, British Library, Harley, 2253, f. 122vb-124va

The author is named as simply "Garin", and it is recorded in the Nouveau Recueil Complet des Fabliaux that because this was such a common name, and there is nothing else to go on, this is insufficient to identify who that was.

MS ABCDE are a single common version.
MS I diverges from MS ABCDE in its description of the welcome of the knight to the castle, which it devotes an extra 50 lines to, the banquet, with a detailed description of the food, and the girl who is offered to the knight, Blancheflor.

MS M, in contrast, cuts out all of the courtly allusions.
The two suggested explanations of this are Rychner's that it was reproduced from memory, and John Hines's that allusion to French courtly literature was omitted for the benefit of an English audience.

Joseph Bédier Bowdlerized the title, as he did others in his edition of the Fabliaux, to Du Chevalier qui fist parler les dames ("make the ladies talk").

See also
Der Rosendorn, a 13th-century German epic poem about a virgin who argues with, is separated from, and subsequently reunited with, her own vagina.

Influences 
Denis Diderot's novel with talking vaginas, Les Bijoux Indiscrets, was inspired by this fabliau.

Notes

References

Bibliography 

 
 

 
 
 

Fabliaux